Bernd Kipp (born 12 August 1948) is a retired German football striker.

References

1948 births
Living people
German footballers
Fortuna Düsseldorf players
SC Preußen Münster players
Association football forwards
2. Bundesliga players
SC Preußen Münster managers